Nzelo Hervé Lembi (born 25 August 1975) is a retired Congolese former football defender.

He joined Germinal Beerschot in autumn 2007.

Having lived in Belgium for ten years, he also holds Belgian nationality.

Lembi's father, Simon Lembi (known as "Lemons"), was also a Zaire international footballer.

References

External links
 

1975 births
Living people
Footballers from Kinshasa
Association football defenders
Democratic Republic of the Congo footballers
Democratic Republic of the Congo expatriate footballers
Democratic Republic of the Congo international footballers
AS Vita Club players
K.S.C. Lokeren Oost-Vlaanderen players
Democratic Republic of the Congo expatriate sportspeople in Belgium
Democratic Republic of the Congo emigrants to Belgium
Democratic Republic of the Congo expatriate sportspeople in Germany
Club Brugge KV players
1. FC Kaiserslautern players
FC Metalurh Donetsk players
Belgian Pro League players
Bundesliga players
Ukrainian Premier League players
Expatriate footballers in Belgium
Expatriate footballers in Germany
Expatriate footballers in Ukraine
Democratic Republic of the Congo expatriate sportspeople in Ukraine
1996 African Cup of Nations players